Admiral Richmond Kelly Turner (May 27, 1885 – February 12, 1961), commonly known as Admiral Kelly Turner, served in the United States Navy during World War II, and is best known for commanding the Amphibious Force during the campaign across the Pacific. Admiral Turner was responsible for the creation of the Underwater Demolition Teams (UDT) that were an early precursor to the United States Navy SEALs.

Early life and career
Richmond Turner was born in Portland, Oregon on May 27, 1885, to Enoch and Laura Frances (née Kelly) Turner. His father alternated between being a rancher and farmer, and working as a printer in both Portland (for The Oregonian with his older brother Thomas) and Stockton, California (where he owned a small print shop). The young Richmond spent most of his childhood in and around Stockton, with a brief stop in Santa Ana, and he graduated from Stockton High School in 1904.

He was appointed to the Naval Academy from California's sixth district, his name put forward by Congressman James C. Needham, in 1904. He graduated on June 5, 1908 and served in several ships over the next four years. One of his classmates was Thomas C. Kinkaid.

On August 3, 1910, he married Harriet "Hattie" Sterling in Stockton.

In 1913, Lieutenant (Junior Grade) Turner briefly held command of the destroyer . After receiving instruction in ordnance engineering and serving on board the gunboat , he was assigned to the battleships ,  and  during 1916–19. From 1919 to 1922, Lieutenant Commander Turner was an ordnance officer at the Naval Gun Factory in Washington, D.C. He then was gunnery officer of the battleship , fleet gunnery officer on the Staff of Commander Scouting Fleet and commanding officer of the destroyer .

After his promotion to the rank of commander in 1925, Turner served with the Bureau of Ordnance at the Navy Department. In 1927, he received flight training at Pensacola, Florida, was designated as a naval aviator, and a year later became commanding officer of the seaplane tender  and commander, Aircraft Squadrons, Asiatic Fleet. He had further aviation-related assignments into the 1930s and was executive officer of the aircraft carrier  in 1933–34. Captain Turner attended the Naval War College and served on that institution's staff in 1935–38 as head of the Strategy faculty.

Turner's last single ship command was the heavy cruiser , on a diplomatic mission to Japan in 1939. During his service with that vessel, Astoria, the body of deceased Japanese Ambassador to the United States, Hiroshi Saito was returned to Japan. Saito died of tuberculosis in February 1939. Following World War II, Turner received Order of the Sacred Treasure, 3rd Class by the Emperor of Japan.

Turner was Director of War Plans in Washington, D.C., in 1940–41 and was promoted to rear admiral January 1941.

Responsibility for Pearl Harbor
As Director of War Plans in the office of Chief of Naval Operations, Captain Turner became the Naval Member of the Joint Planning Committee of the Joint Board. Turner and Colonel Joseph T. McNarney, Air Corps, U.S. Army wrote "Study of the Immediate Problems concerning Involvement in War" in late December 1940. This led to Plan D, a strong offensive war in the Atlantic and a defensive war in the Pacific. This evolved into U.S. war plan "Rainbow Five".

On November 25, 1941, Turner drafted a dispatch to the Commander in Chief of the Asiatic Fleet for release by the Chief of Naval Operations (CNO), which contained the words: "I consider it probable that this next Japanese aggression may cause an outbreak of hostilities between the U.S. and Japan." CNO Admiral Harold Rainsford Stark took this message to President Roosevelt, who in relaying it to his High Commissioner to the Philippines softened the judgment words "probable" to "possible" and "may" to "might." Roosevelt also added the bad guess: "Advance against Thailand seems the most probable."

The Commander of the U.S. Pacific Fleet, Admiral Husband E. Kimmel, was highly aware of the threat of surprise Japanese attack at Pearl Harbor. The final and most important warning was sent from Washington to Pearl Harbor and other Pacific outposts on November 27, 1941. It was specifically designated as a "war warning."

Turner made the decision not to send Kimmel details of the intercepted Japanese diplomatic communications although they pointed strongly to an imminent air or sea attack on the Pacific Fleet's base at Pearl Harbor. Kimmel testified after the war that had he known of these communications, he would have maintained a much higher level of alert, and the fleet would not have been taken by surprise by the Japanese attack. As historian of the attack on Pearl Harbor, Professor Gordon Prange, wrote in Pearl Harbor: The Verdict of History that was correct, even allowing for Kimmel's desire to exculpate himself: "If Turner thought a Japanese raid on Hawaii ... to be a 50-percent chance, it was his clear duty to say so plainly in his directive to Kimmel ... He won the battle for dominance of War Plans over Intelligence, and had to abide by the consequences. If his estimates had enabled the U.S. to fend off ... the Japanese threat at Pearl Harbor, Turner would deserve the appreciation of a grateful nation. By the same token, he could not justly avoid his share of the blame for failure."

Vice Admiral Homer N. Wallin wrote a much more comprehensive analysis of the reasons for the U.S. defeat at Pearl Harbor. See also Rear Admiral Edwin T. Layton, Kimmel's chief intelligence officer, and his book, And I Was There. "To anyone who is familiar with the mutinous conditions provoked by Turner's interference in the intelligence process . . .throughout 1941, (Turner's) barefaced denial of any responsibility for its consequences was as outrageous as it was untrue."  Page 142.

Admiral Turner testified to the Roberts Commission on January 19, 1942, the Admiral Thomas C. Hart Inquiry on the April 3rd and 4th, 1944, the Navy Court of Inquiry headed by Admiral Orin G. Murfin on September 15, 1944 and the Joint Congressional Committee Investigating Pearl Harbor in 1946.

World War II

In December 1941, Turner was appointed assistant chief of staff to the Commander in Chief, United States Fleet (a new position created after Pearl Harbor for Admiral Ernest King) and served until June 1942. He was then sent to the Pacific to take command of the Amphibious Force, South Pacific Force. Over the next three years, he held a variety of senior Amphibious Force commands as a rear admiral and vice admiral. He helped plan and execute amphibious operations against enemy positions in the south, central and western Pacific. He would have commanded the amphibious component of the invasion of Japan.

For the Guadalcanal Campaign, Rear Admiral Turner was Commander, Amphibious Force South Pacific (ComPhibForSoPac), also known as Task Force 62 which included 9 Groups, including Landing Force, Major General Alexander Vandegrift and Screening Group, Rear Admiral Victor Crutchley, Royal Navy. He successfully fought the five-month campaign to victory which included the galling defeat at Savo Island.

For the assault on the Russell Islands, Rear Admiral Turner, was named as the Commander of the Joint Force designated Task Force 61, with the Commanding General 43rd Infantry Division, Major General John H. Hester, U.S. Army, being the Commander Landing Force. For the assault on the New Georgia Groups of Islands, Rear Admiral Turner, was named as the Commander Task Force 31 which included New Georgia Occupation Force, Major General Hester.

For the assault on Tarawa and Makin, Rear Admiral Turner was named as the Commander, Assault Force Task Force 51, which included 10 Groups, including Northern Attack Force for Makin and Southern Attack Force for Tarawa, Rear Admiral Harry W. Hill.

At Tarawa: "Rear Admiral Turner, the Task Force Commander and Immediate Senior in Command, was well over the horizon and busy with the problems of Makin. Vice Admiral Spruance, the Commander Central Pacific Force, was present at Tarawa in the Indianapolis, but with that quality which endeared him to all his subordinates, did not undertake to kibitz on the minute-by-minute performance of the local Task Force or Task Group Commanders. To Rear Admiral Harry Hill belongs full credit for a great and hard-fought victory at Tarawa."

For the assault on the Marshall Islands, Roi-Namur and Kwajalein, Rear Admiral Turner was the Commander, Joint Expeditionary Force, Task Force 51, which included 3 Task Forces and 9 Task Groups.

As a result of his leadership in those many amphibious assaults, Turner was promoted to vice admiral on March 7, 1944.

For the assaults on Tinian, Guam and Saipan, Vice Admiral Turner was the Commander, Joint Expeditionary Force, Task Force 51, which included the Northern and Southern Task Forces, Expeditionary Task Force, Lt. General Holland Smith and 6 Task Groups.

For the assault on Iwo Jima, Vice Admiral Turner was the Commander, Joint Expeditionary Force, Task Force 50, which included the Attack Force, Rear Admiral Hill, and Expeditionary Task Force, Lt. General Smith.

At the Battle of Okinawa Turner commanded Task Force 51 which included the Northern Attack Force, Rear Admiral Lawrence Fairfax Reifsnider, the Southern Attack Force, Rear Admiral Hill, Expeditionary Troops, Lt. General Simon Bolivar Buckner Jr., Western Island Attack Group, Rear Admiral Ingolf N. Kiland, Amphibious Support Force Rear Admiral William H. P. Blandy and Gunfire and Covering Force, Rear Admiral Morton Deyo. At the end of the Battle of Okinawa the Amphibious Forces under Admiral Turner's command were manned by 657,000 officers and men.

On May 24, 1945, Richmond Kelly Turner was promoted to full Admiral. Had the Pacific war continued, he would have commanded the amphibious component of the invasion of Japan. Under Admiral Turner's command, there were to be 2,700 ships and craft in the Kyushu operation. There had been 1,213 ships and craft under his command for the Okinawa operation, 435 for the Marianas operation and 51 at Guadalcanal.

Later life

After World War II, Admiral Turner served on the Navy Department's General Board and was U.S. Naval Representative on the United Nations Military Staff Committee. He retired from active duty in July 1947.

Admiral Turner died in Monterey, California, on February 12, 1961. He is buried in Golden Gate National Cemetery in San Bruno, California, alongside his wife and Admirals Chester Nimitz, Raymond A. Spruance, and Charles A. Lockwood, an arrangement made by all of them while living.

Personal life
He was the brother of the socialist  and pacifist writer John Kenneth Turner.

Awards

Legacy

Personality
Admiral Turner was known in his surrounding by his complicated personality and furious temper. Nicknamed "Terrible Turner," many of his subordinates and colleagues recognized his command abilities, but on the other hand criticized his manners, heavy drinking and pedantry. When Admiral Chester Nimitz accepted Turner as commander of his assault force, Nimitz dryly said of the assignment that Turner was "brilliant, caustic, arrogant, and tactless – just the man for the job".

Future Marine general Robert E. Hogaboom, who served as his assistant chief of staff for operations, describes him as:

General Nathan Twining, who served as chief of staff of the Allied air forces in South Pacific during World War II, described Turner as:

Honors and depictions
The  destroyer leader (later classified guided missile cruiser)  (DLG-20/CG-20) was named in honor of Admiral Turner.

Turner appears in To the Shores of Iwo Jima, a documentary short film depicting the American assault on the Japanese-held island of Iwo Jima and the massive battle that raged on that key island in the Allied advance on Japan.

Turner was portrayed by actor Stuart Randall in the film The Gallant Hours.

See also
 Guadalcanal Campaign, first major amphibious operation

References

Bibliography

Further reading

External links
 
 

1885 births
1961 deaths
Military personnel from Portland, Oregon
United States Navy personnel of World War I
United States Naval Academy alumni
Naval War College alumni
Naval War College faculty
United States Navy admirals
United States Navy World War II admirals
Recipients of the Navy Cross (United States)
Recipients of the Navy Distinguished Service Medal
Recipients of the Distinguished Service Medal (US Army)
Companions of the Order of the Bath
The Oregonian people
Burials at Golden Gate National Cemetery